Foggy Bottom–GWU Kennedy Center is an Washington Metro station in the Foggy Bottom neighborhood of Washington, D.C., United States. The island-platformed station was opened on July 1, 1977, and is operated by the Washington Metropolitan Area Transit Authority (WMATA). Providing service for the Blue, Silver, and Orange Lines, the station is located on I Street on the George Washington University (GWU) campus. It is the last westbound station in the District of Columbia on these lines before they dive under the Potomac River to Virginia.

History 
The station opened on July 1, 1977. Orange Line service to the station began upon the line's opening on November 20, 1978.

Station layout 
Foggy Bottom–GWU uses a simple island platform layout: one platform with a track on each side. Track C1 carries eastbound trains to New Carrollton and Largo Town Center whilst track C2 is used by westbound trains to Vienna and Franconia–Springfield. As with all stations on the Metro, there are platform edge lights to warn passengers of incoming trains. In 2008, the WMATA installed red-colored LED lights at Foggy Bottom–GWU and other busy stations after a successful pilot at Gallery Place. There is a 22 coffer "waffle vault" ceiling at Foggy Bottom–GWU as it was one of the first stations to be built in the system; later underground stations abandoned this design for a simpler concrete arch.

There is a single mezzanine located at the center of the platform. Escalators from here allow passengers to descend to platform level or to the sole entrance and exit of the station at the northwestern corner of I and 23rd Streets. A total of two elevators and six escalators (three between the street and mezzanine and three between the mezzanine and platform) are currently in use at the station.

Location 
Foggy Bottom–GWU serves the neighborhood of Foggy Bottom and the campus of The George Washington University. It is also the nearest station to the Georgetown neighborhood. The station is located at 23rd and I streets in Northwest, just south of Washington Circle, and at the front entrance to the George Washington University Hospital. Service began on July 1, 1977. The World Bank is located one block south and eight blocks east at Pennsylvania Avenue and 18th Street and The Watergate is slightly more than .75 miles (1.2 km) southwest of the station. Slightly south of The Watergate is the John F. Kennedy Center for the Performing Arts.

Notable places nearby 
George Washington University Hospital
School Without Walls
Harry S Truman Building (United States Department of State)
Lincoln Memorial
Georgetown
Downtown
Washington Circle
 George Washington University
Kennedy Center

References

External links 

 The Schumin Web Transit Center: Foggy Bottom–GWU Station
 23rd Street entrance from Google Maps Street View

Stations on the Blue Line (Washington Metro)
Stations on the Orange Line (Washington Metro)
Stations on the Silver Line (Washington Metro)
Washington Metro stations in Washington, D.C.
Foggy Bottom
Railway stations in the United States opened in 1977
Railway stations in Washington, D.C., at university and college campuses
1977 establishments in Washington, D.C.
George Washington University buildings and structures
Railway stations located underground in Washington, D.C.